Fumihisa (written:  or ) is a masculine Japanese given name. Notable people with the name include:

, Japanese sport shooter
, Japanese ski jumper

Japanese masculine given names